Thomas Hennell (16 April 1903 – 1945) was a British artist and writer who specialised in illustrations and essays on the subject of the British countryside. He was an official war artist during the Second World War and was killed while serving in Indonesia in November 1945.

Early life

Hennell was born in Ridley, Kent in 1903, the second son of the Rev. Harold Barclay Hennell and Ethel Mary Hennell. He attended primary school in Broadstairs and then secondary school at Bradfield College, Berkshire before studying art at Regent Street Polytechnic. Hennell qualified as a teacher in 1928 and taught for some years at the Kingswood School, Bath and at the King's School, Bruton in Somerset. Whilst at college Hennell had begun travelling around the British countryside to work on essays and illustrations of rural landscapes. He had a nervous breakdown from 1932–35 and was detained at the Maudsley Hospital.  When he recovered he returned to the work of recording scenes of rural crafts and craftsmen at work. He worked closely with H J Massingham, illustrating books by him and others. Edward Bawden, a fellow artist, encouraged Hennell to write The Witnesses, an account of his mental illness.

Artist Biography

At the outbreak of war in 1939 Hennell wrote to the War Artists' Advisory Committee, WAAC, offering his services as an artist. He worked for the Pilgrim Trust in 1940, and the Ministry of Information in 1941, producing watercolours of rural crafts and agriculture in Kent, Dorset, Berkshire and Worcestershire. In March 1941 one of his paintings was purchased by WAAC and, later, he was given a commission to make drawings of harvest work. In 1943 Hennell was named as a full-time salaried war artist and sent to replace Eric Ravilious in Iceland. He painted in Iceland throughout the second half of 1943 before going to the northeast of England in January 1944 to paint maritime topics. In May 1944 Hennell went to Portsmouth to record the preparations for D-Day, which he took part in. Throughout the invasion he spent two months with the Canadian First Army as they moved through the north of France. At this time he painted scenes of German prisoners of war and also the launch sites of V-1 flying bombs. In October 1944 he was transferred to a Royal Navy unit with whom he recorded the Allied advance into Belgium and Holland.

Hennell returned to England for surgery before starting an assignment with the Air Ministry in the Far East. He arrived in Burma in June 1945 and was based with an RAF unit near Rangoon as the Japanese retreated. Hennell completed a painting of an Allied victory parade in the city featuring Lord Mountbatten and also painted Indian units building an airstrip in the jungle. From Rangoon Hennell travelled by train to Calcutta, then sailed to Colombo. From Colombo Hennell sailed aboard  to Penang and witnessed the retaking of the town and, later, the surrender of Singapore. After Singapore, Hennell went to Indonesia and was at Surabaya in Java when he was captured by Indonesian nationalist fighters in November 1945 and was presumed to have been killed shortly thereafter.

Legacy
Hennell's art works centred on the countryside, and in particular hedging, threshing, baling, and clearing orchards etc. Hennell was a member of The Royal Watercolour Society and exhibited in the New English Art Club. A number of his works are held by the Imperial War Museum and are also part of the Ministry of Defence art collection.

Bibliography
 1934: Change in the Farm
 1936: Poems - with wood-engravings by Eric Ravilious
 1938: The Witnesses
 1943: British Craftsmen
 1947: The Countryman at Work
 1947: Six Poems - privately printed at Tunbridge Wells School of Arts and Crafts

Hennell provided illustrations for
 1939: A Countryman's Journey by H.J Massingham,
 1939: Country Relics by H.J Massingham,
 1940: Chiltern Country by H.J Massingham,
 1943: English Farming by J.Russell,
 1943: The Land is Yours by C.H Warren,
 1944: Miles from Anywhere by C.H Warren,
 1944: Farms and Fields by C.S & C.S. Orwin
 1946: The Natural Order – Essays in the Return to Husbandry by H.J Massingham (with Philip Mairet, Lord Northbourne, the Earl of Portsmouth)
 1946-49: Recording Britain, Volumes 1,3 & 4 by A.Palmer (Editor),
 1948: The Windmills of Thomas Hennell by Alan Stoyel.

References

Further reading
 Thomas Hennell Countryman, Artist and Writer by Michael Macleod, Cambridge University Press, 1988, 
 Thomas Hennell : the land and the mind by Jessica Kilburn, London : Pimpernel Press Ltd, 2021, 

1903 births
1945 deaths
20th-century English male artists
20th-century English painters
20th-century English writers
British war artists
British watercolourists
Deaths in Indonesia
English male painters
Military personnel from Kent
People educated at Bradfield College
People from Sevenoaks District
People with mental disorders
Royal Navy personnel killed in World War II
Royal Naval Volunteer Reserve personnel of World War II
Royal Navy officers of World War II
World War II artists